Tony Robinson's Time Walks is an Australian factual television series hosted by Tony Robinson. The series takes a storytelling approach to document the cities of Australia and New Zealand.

Series 1
 Fremantle
 Melbourne
 Hobart
 Bendigo
 Newcastle
 Carlton
 Brisbane
 St Kilda
 Woolloomooloo
 Adelaide

Series 2
 Kalgoorlie
 Launceston
 Christchurch
 Canberra
 Barossa Valley
 Wellington
 Townsville
 Parramatta
 Geelong
 Alice Springs

References

Australian television series